Papa Elise is an islet of Funafuti, Tuvalu. The name Papa Elise is a translation of Father Ellice, and refers to a missionary who came to Funafuti in the late 19th century.

References

Islands of Tuvalu
Pacific islands claimed under the Guano Islands Act
Funafuti